Football Club Drouais is a French association football team based in Dreux, France. The team, founded in 1991, plays its home games at the Stade Jean-Bruck in Dreux. As of the 2022–23 season, they play in Championnat National 3, the fifth tier of French football. in 2018 they were administratively relegated from Championnat National 3 for breach of financial rules.

Coupe de France
FC Drouais reached the round of 64 in 2012–13 Coupe de France, their best ever performance in the competition

Famous players
  Kalifa Cissé
  Patrick Vieira, world champion in 1998 with France.

References

External links
  

Drouais
1991 establishments in France
Sport in Eure-et-Loir
Association football clubs established in 1991
Football clubs in Centre-Val de Loire